Liu Kai (born 11 October 1987 in Tianjin, China) is a left-handed pitcher in the New York Yankees organization. Liu Kai was later released by the New York Yankees minor league system along with his Chinese teammate Zhang Zhenwang.

Liu began playing organized baseball at the age of 12, when he was enrolled in a sports school in China.  At age 16, he became a professional baseball player when he began playing for the Guangdong Leopards of the China Baseball League. He has also participated as a member of the People's Republic of China National Team.

Liu's best pitch is his fastball, topping out at 84 miles per hour.

On June 18, 2007, became the first baseball player born in the People's Republic of China to sign a Major League Baseball contract with the prior permission of the China Baseball Association, along with Zhang Zhenwang, who also signed with the Yankees.  The first baseball player born in the People's Republic of China to sign with a Major League Baseball club was pitcher Wang Chao, who signed with the Seattle Mariners on August 9, 2001.

References

1987 births
2009 World Baseball Classic players
Baseball players at the 2008 Summer Olympics
Baseball players from Tianjin
Chinese baseball players
Chinese expatriate baseball players in the United States
Guangdong Leopards players
Living people
Olympic baseball players of China